Margaret Anchoretta Ormsby  (7 June 1909 – 2 November 1996) was a Canadian historian, particularly concerning the history of British Columbia.  She was head of the Department of History at the University of British Columbia.

Early life and education

Ormsby was born in Quesnel, British Columbia, and raised in the Okanagan Valley.  She enrolled at the University of British Columbia (UBC) in 1925, graduating with a Bachelor of Arts in 1929, and a Master of Arts in 1931, both in History.  While pursuing her PhD at Bryn Mawr College in Pennsylvania she interrupted those studies to work as a teaching assistant in history at UBC, then graduated from Bryn Mawr in 1936.

Career
Ormsby taught in the United States for the next three years, then became a lecturer at McMaster University in 1940, returning to teach at UBC in 1943.  In 1955 she was appointed Professor and in 1965 became head of the university's Department of History, a position she held until her retirement in 1974.

Ormsby was chair of the Historic Sites and Monuments Board of Canada from 1960 to 1967. She received honorary doctorates from the University of Victoria and Simon Fraser University as well as UBC, and holds the Insignia of the Order of British Columbia.

During her career she wrote extensively about the history and political development of British Columbia. In 1976 she was editor of the book A Pioneer Gentle Woman in British Columbia: the Recollections of Susan Allison.

Ormsby's 1958 book, British Columbia:  A History, provided a framework for both timeline and causation of historical events in British Columbia's past. The book has been used as a resource by many historians and teachers. Although the book is more than 60 years old, it is still held in more than 350 libraries in 2018. Ormsby posited a series of propositions that sought to explain the ongoing pull between maritime and continental forces; the opposition between a hierarchical model of society represented by the Hudson's Bay Company and colonial officials, and the more egalitarian ideas of English and Canadian settlers; and regional tensions between Vancouver Island and mainland, metropolitan Vancouver and the hinterland interior.

Bibliography

Her works include:
 - Total pages: 558  commemorating the centennial of the designation of B.C. as a crown colony.
A Pioneer Gentle Woman in British Columbia: the Recollections of Susan Allison (1976) (see John Fall Allison)
Coldstream - Nulli Secundus (1990)

See also
List of Canadian historians

References

UBC Archives, Fonds Description

External links
In Memoriam, article in UBC Reports November 14, 1996 by Jean Barman
Order of British Columbia biography
Margaret E. Prang, Margaret Anchoretta Ormsby, Canadian Encyclopedia Archived at the Wayback Machine

Cariboo people
University of British Columbia alumni
McMaster University alumni
Bryn Mawr College alumni
Members of the Order of British Columbia
1996 deaths
1909 births
20th-century Canadian women writers
20th-century Canadian historians
Canadian women historians
Presidents of the Canadian Historical Association